Chrysolina bicolor is a species of beetle belonging to the Chrysomelidae family.

Description

Pronotum is usually metallic blue. Elytra are densely punctured and vary from metallic green to reddish, sometimes with darker violet spots. The main host plants are lavender, oregano, rosemary and thyme.

Distribution
This species occurs in Spain, Portugal, Sicily, Croatia and North Africa.

References

Zipcodezoo
Encyclopedia of Life

External links
Chrysomelidae
Nature of Israel
Biol.uni
Gevic.net

Chrysomelinae
Taxa named by Johan Christian Fabricius
Beetles described in 1775